Valci Teixeira Júnior, more commonly known as Valci Júnior, is a Brazilian football (soccer) player who plays as a striker for Yangon United. He scored on his Yangon United debut against GFA within the first twelve minutes, and remains as the only foreign signing for Yangon United in the 2022 window.

References

External links

Profile at Thaipremierleague.co.th

1987 births
Living people
Brazilian footballers
Association football forwards
TOT S.C. players
Sisaket F.C. players
TTM Phichit F.C. players
Port F.C. players
Nakhon Ratchasima F.C. players
Rayong United F.C. players
Krabi F.C. players
Bangkok F.C. players
Bang Pa-in Ayutthaya F.C. players
Udon Thani F.C. players
Brazilian expatriate sportspeople in Thailand
Expatriate footballers in Thailand
Thai League 1 players
Thai League 2 players
Footballers from Brasília
J3 League players
Gainare Tottori players
Brazilian expatriate footballers
Expatriate footballers in Japan
Expatriate footballers in Cambodia
Phnom Penh Crown FC players
Brazilian expatriate sportspeople in Cambodia